East Bend may refer to:

East Bend, Kentucky, a region of Boone County
East Bend, North Carolina, a town in Yadkin County
East Bend Township, Champaign County, Illinois, a township in Champaign County
East Bend Township, Yadkin County, North Carolina

See also
East Bend Church, a historic church in Union, Kentucky
East Bend Generating Station, a coal-fired power plant near Rabbit Hash, Kentucky